Kristina Alexandrovna Oblasova (born 11 September 1984, in Moscow) is a Russian former competitive figure skater. She is the 2001 World Junior champion and the 2004 Russian national bronze medalist.

Career 
Oblasova began learning to skate in 1989. She trained mainly in singles, except for a brief interlude at age 10 when she trained in pairs with partner Stanislav Zakharov.

A hip injury kept Oblasova off the ice for seven months in the 1997–98 season. She debuted on the ISU Junior Grand Prix circuit the following season. 

In 2000–01, Oblasova took the silver medal at the ISU Junior Grand Prix Final and then gold at the 2001 World Junior Championships. She was coached by Elena Tchaikovskaya and Vladimir Kotin. 

In 2001–02, Oblasova made her senior Grand Prix debut, competing at Skate Canada International and Sparkassen Cup on Ice. After Russian Nationals, she changed coaches to Viktor Kudriavtsev. Oblasova was assigned again to Junior Worlds where she finished 11th. In 2003, a third trip to Junior Worlds saw her finish 9th. 

In 2003–04, her final competitive season, Oblasova won the senior bronze medal at the Russian Nationals and was assigned to the 2004 European Championships. She finished 16th in her only trip to a senior ISU Championships.

Programs

Competitive highlights 
GP: Grand Prix; JGP: Junior Grand Prix

References

External links

 
 Official site

Russian female single skaters
Living people
1984 births
Figure skaters from Moscow
World Junior Figure Skating Championships medalists